Slammers Bar & Pizza Kitchen is a lesbian bar in Columbus, Ohio. Opened in 1993, it is Ohio's oldest gay bar and is still run by its original owner Marcia Riley. , it is one of approximately twenty remaining in the country and the only one in Ohio. It was supported by the Lesbian Bar Project to help it survive the COVID-19 pandemic.

As has been the case with lesbian bars across the country, Slammers has needed to evolve to adapt to the changing LGBTQ+ nightlife scene. While it began as a women's bar, early on it drew a business lunch crowd.

References

External Links 
Slammers Bar & Pizza Kitchen webpage

1993 establishments in Ohio
Bars (establishments)
Buildings and structures in Ohio
Drinking establishments in Ohio
Lesbian culture in the United States
Lesbian history
LGBT drinking establishments in the United States
Women in Ohio
Companies based in the Columbus, Ohio metropolitan area